() in Ulaanbaatar, Mongolia) is a former professional sumo wrestler and current politician of the Democratic Party in Mongolia. He was the first wrestler from Mongolia to reach sumo's top makuuchi division.

Career
He was a diligent practitioner of Mongolian wrestling from a young age, but had ambitions of becoming a policeman. However, in late 1991, a Japanese sumo training stable master, Ōshima-oyakata (the former ōzeki Asahikuni) went to Mongolia to recruit promising wrestlers for sumo. The young Davaagiin Batbayar happened to notice the advertisement and applied along with 120 others. He was selected and went to Japan with five others, including Kyukotenhō and Kyokutenzan. They were the first Mongolians ever to join sumo.  He was immediately given the shikona of Kyokushūzan, meaning "eagle mountain of the rising sun." He made his professional debut in March 1992. However six months later, due to cultural differences, language problems, and an extremely hard training regime, five of them including Kyokushūzan ran away from the training stable to the Mongolian embassy. He was eventually persuaded to return by his stablemaster's wife, and also Kyokutenzan.

In March 1995, he was promoted to the jūryō division, and in September 1996 to the top makuuchi division. After his single appearance as a komusubi in March 1997 he was ranked as a maegashira for 58 tournaments in a row, a record in the sumo world. He was a runner-up in two tournaments in March 2003 and September 2004, and was awarded five special prizes for his achievements in tournaments – two for Technique, two for Fighting Spirit and one for Outstanding Performance.  He also earned five kinboshi or gold stars for defeating yokozuna, the last coming in May 2003 against fellow Mongolian Asashōryū. Determined to get revenge in the next tournament in July, Asashōryū pulled on Kyokushūzan's topknot; a foul for which he was disqualified (hansoku), the first time this had ever happened to a yokozuna (Kyokushūzan did not get a kinboshi on that occasion as they are not given for wins by hansoku).

As he succeeded in the ring, his popularity in Mongolia soared. Also, as he has contributed much to his country by establishing several foundations for the welfare of the youth and sick people, he is now regarded as one of the heroes of the country. In April 2004, he started to study on a correspondence course for an MSc in telecommunications at Waseda University in Japan. This is partly because the Mongolian president advised him to study while in Japan for his future.

Fighting style
At the beginning of his top division career he gained great popularity with audiences due to his variety of techniques, which were influenced by Mongolian wrestling. Less often seen in sumo, they surprised many of his early opponents. He was known as the gino depato, or "department store of techniques." In the May 2002 tournament, he won his first eight bouts in a row, using eight different techniques. However, because he was in danger of injuring other wrestlers, he was eventually told by the Sumo Association to stop using some of them, and by the end of his career he had a much more defensive (and less successful) style. His most common winning kimarite overall were uwatenage (overarm throw) and yorikiri (force out), using his preferred mawashi grip of migi-yotsu (left hand outside, right hand inside). However his next most common were hatakikomi (slap down) and hikiotoshi (pull down), reflecting his change of style.

Retirement from sumo
In November 2006, he suddenly announced his retirement two days into the Kyushu tournament. At the time this was thought to be because of a heart problem. A ceremony in his honour was held in Ulaanbaatar at the end of 2006, attended by the Mongolian Prime Minister, who thanked him for strengthening the ties between Mongolia and Japan. Kyokushūzan's danpatsu-shiki, the official retirement ceremony where the retired rikishi's topknot is cut off, was reportedly going to be held in Mongolia, but eventually took place at the Ryōgoku Kokugikan in Tokyo on June 2, 2007. Soon after the ceremony, on June 4, 2007, Kyokushūzan released a memorial photobook.

It subsequently emerged that Kyokushūzan was the victim of an attempted extortion by gangsters, linked to the Sumiyoshi-kai crime syndicate. The gangsters were all arrested, and Kyokushūzan told police that this incident was one reason for his retirement.

He moved into Mongolian politics and in June 2008 was elected to the Mongolian parliament on the opposition Democratic Party ticket. In the 2012 Parliamentary elections, he ran in his native Khovd Province but was not elected. He worked as an advisor on Japan to the Prime Minister of Mongolia Chimediin Saikhanbileg from 2013. He ran for the Democratic Party again in the 2020 Parliamentary elections but was once more unsuccessful.

During his active career and since his retirement Kyokushūzan has been an active recruiter of Mongolian sumo wrestlers to enter professional sumo, using his connections to help fellow Mongolians interested in joining sumo to find a stable looking to recruit a foreign wrestler. In this regard, he was instrumental in starting the careers of younger sumo wrestlers such as Hakuhō, Tamawashi and Mōkonami. He estimates he has recruited around 25 Mongolians for professional sumo over the years.

Personal life
In May 2000, Kyokushūzan married a Mongolian woman who was studying in Japan. The couple have a son and a daughter.

Career record

See also
List of sumo tournament top division runners-up
List of sumo tournament second division champions
Glossary of sumo terms
List of non-Japanese sumo wrestlers
List of past sumo wrestlers
List of komusubi

References

External links

1973 births
Living people
Mongolian sumo wrestlers
Komusubi
Members of the State Great Khural
Democratic Party (Mongolia) politicians
Sportspeople from Ulaanbaatar
Mongolian sportsperson-politicians
Mongolian expatriates in Japan